The 2013 Poznań Open was a professional tennis tournament played on clay courts. It was the jubilee tenth edition of the tournament which was part of the 2013 ATP Challenger Tour. It took place at the Park Tenisowy Olimpia in Poznań, Poland from 13 to 21 July 2013, including the qualifying competition in the first two days.

Singles main draw entrants

Seeds

Other entrants
The following players received wildcards into the singles main draw:
  Piotr Gadomski 
  Wojciech Lutkowski
  Kamil Majchrzak 
  Grzegorz Panfil

The following player received entry using a protected ranking:
  Andreas Beck

The following players received entry from the qualifying draw:
  Andriej Kapaś
  Filip Krajinović
  Thiago Monteiro
  Daniel Smethurst

Withdrawals
Before the tournament
  Facundo Bagnis
  Jonathan Dasnières de Veigy
  Rogério Dutra da Silva
  André Ghem
  Javier Martí

Doubles main draw entrants

Seeds

Other entrants
The following pairs received wildcards into the doubles main draw:
  Adam Chadaj /  Piotr Gadomski
  Bogdan Dzudzewicz /  Mikołaj Jędruszczak
  Maciej Lorenz /  Bartosz Sawicki

Champions

Singles

 Andreas Haider-Maurer def.  Damir Džumhur, 4–6, 6–1, 7–5

Doubles

 Gero Kretschmer /  Alexander Satschko def.  Henri Kontinen /  Mateusz Kowalczyk, 6–3, 6–3

References

External links
Official Website
ATP Challenger Tour
Official Player Acceptance List

Poznań Open
Poznań Open
Poz